Darna is the self-titled debut album by the Spanish Heavy metal band Darna, released in May 2001.

Track listing
 Intro
 Muere El Silencio (Silence Dies)
 La Edad de La Ira (The Age of The Rage)
 Loco Bardo (Crazy Bard)
 Sheela
 El Oráculo (The Oracle)
 La Larga Marcha (The Long Journey)
 Secuelas (Sequels)
 Para La Eternidad (For Eternity)
 Desleal (Unloyal)

References

2001 debut albums
Darna (band) albums